The 1949–50 UCLA Bruins men's basketball team represented the University of California, Los Angeles during the 1949–50 NCAA men's basketball season and were members of the Pacific Coast Conference. The Bruins were led by second year head coach John Wooden. They finished the regular season with a record of 24–7 and were southern division champions with a record of 10–2.

Previous season

The Bruins finished the season 22–7 overall and won the PCC South Division with a record of 10–2.

Roster

Schedule

|-
!colspan=9 style=|Exhibition

|-
!colspan=9 style=|Regular Season

|-
!colspan=9 style=|Conference Championship

|-
!colspan=12 style="background:#;"| NCAA tournament

Source

Rankings

References

UCLA Bruins men's basketball seasons
Ucla
UCLA
UCLA Bruins Basketball
UCLA Bruins Basketball